María Luisa Ronquillo (born 13 December 1956) is a Mexican long-distance runner. She competed in the women's marathon at the 1984 Summer Olympics.

References

1956 births
Living people
Athletes (track and field) at the 1984 Summer Olympics
Mexican female long-distance runners
Mexican female marathon runners
Olympic athletes of Mexico
Place of birth missing (living people)
20th-century Mexican women